Sayyid Ata'ollah Mohajerani (also Romanized as Atā'ollāh Mohājerāni; born 24 July 1954) is an Iranian journalist, author, and reformist politician. Mohajerani served as Minister of Culture and Islamic Guidance of Iran under President Mohammad Khatami from 1997 until 2000 when he was resigned from office for alleged permissiveness." He wrote a book about Salman Rushdie, and defends the Fatwa to kill him; he is living as a UK citizen.

Education
Mohajerani received his bachelor's degree in history from University of Isfahan, his master's degree in history and Iranian culture from Shiraz University and his PhD in history from Tarbiat Modares University.

Career

Mohajerani's political career began in 1980 after the Iranian Revolution, when he won the first round of the parliamentary elections to become a representative of Shiraz and the youngest member of the majlis. Later, he became the Parliamentary Deputy to the Prime Minister Mir-Hossein Mousavi, when he started to write the weekly column Naghd-e Haal in the Ettela'at newspaper, and then Vice President of Parliamentary Affairs under Ali Akbar Hashemi Rafsanjani.

As minister of culture and Islamic guidance, he officially announced and pursued a policy of "leniency" towards the field of culture and arts and removed many restrictions. He earned the wrath of conservatives by allowing hundreds of new publications to start up, the release of fifty-some Persian pop music albums, and the screening of the controversial movie Two Women.

He survived impeachment by the 5th Majlis which was dominated by the conservatives in part with a "daring" speech defending the principle of freedom of speech in Islamic rather than Western terms.

In April 2000, however, he resigned due to heavy criticisms by the Iranian Supreme Leader, Ayatollah Khamenei, because of his "liberal" policies. He also served as the speaker of the cabinet during that time. He later became the president of the Iranian International Centre for Dialogue among Civilizations, but resigned from the post.

He was a member and a founder of Executives of Construction Party, which is considered a backer of Ali Akbar Hashemi Rafsanjani.

Mohajerani participated in the funeral and burial of former revolutionary Prime Minister Mehdi Bazargan, when few Iranian officials dared doing so because of Bazargan's very unpopular status among the higher ranks of the Islamic Republic government.

Works
Of the books Mohajerani has written, most famous are a "learned critique" of the Salman Rushdie novel Satanic Verses, a book in support of Ferdowsi (and against attacks by Ahmad Shamlou), and a book on Zaynab bint Ali's role in and after Aashurah. 
His other publications/works include:
 Gray heaven/paradise, 2007.

Personal life
Mohajerani is married to Jamileh Kadivar, who is also a reformist politician and a former member of parliament.

Mohajerani left Iran and as of 2009 lives in England with his wife. They launched a website called www.maktoub.ir. 
  
Mohajerani is "a vocal supporter of the pro-democracy Green Movement," and opposes violence against the Iranian government saying "If we answer violence with violence, we are no different from them." His daughter Zahra lives in Los Angeles, California as a senior manager at Rivian.

Advocating Khomeini's order to kill British author
After Ruhollah Khomeini issued a fatwa ordering Muslims to kill Salman Rushdie because of his novel The Satanic Verses, Mohajerani published a book called Critique of the Satanic Verses Conspiracy in 1989. Mohajarani quoted Khomeini's fatwa at the beginning of his book and approved and justified the fatwa.
In 1995, Mohajerani wrote a short story gleefully satirising this British writer's fear of being attacked. Responding to Khomeini's Fatwa, on July 2, 1993, unknown assailants set fire to a hotel in the Turkish city of Sivas that was hosting a speech by Aziz Nesin, a renowned humorist who had translated the book into Turkish. A total of 35 people plus two perpetrators were killed in the blaze, and 145 people were injured. Mohajirani insisted that the massacre was a proud moment in what he called the glorious Islamic reawakening and wrote that Khomeini's fatwa had worked like a vaccine preventing further criticism of the prophet of Islam. So far, no proper study has been conducted into the role of Mohajerani and his book in promoting this massacre of intellectuals, translators and publishers worldwide.

In January 2023, The Guardian reported that the Metropolitan Police was reviewing a legal dossier filed in August 2022 that accused Mohajerani of encouraging terrorism contrary to the Terrorism Act 2006.

References

External links
 Mohajerani's Persian weblog
 Mohajerani at the ICCNC in Oakland, California
 Video: Dr. Sayyed Ataollah Mohajerani speaks about Dialogue
 Ata'ollah Mohajerani - Archives for Baha’i Persecution in Iran
 The Fatwa Advocate, Ata'ollah Mohajerani
 Ataollah Mohajerani speaks to reporters April 24 about his impending impeachment hearing
 Academic Articles by Ata'ollah Mohajerani
 Ata'ollah Mohajerani's Biography

1954 births
Living people
People from Arak, Iran
Shiraz University alumni
Tarbiat Modares University alumni
University of Isfahan alumni
Executives of Construction Party politicians
Iranian reformists
Government ministers of Iran
Vice Presidents of Iran for Legal and Parliamentary Affairs
Spokespersons of the Government of Iran
Iranian writers
Iranian journalists
Iranian emigrants to the United Kingdom
Members of the 1st Islamic Consultative Assembly
Impeached Iranian officials